Bia  is a genus of plant of the family Euphorbiaceae first described as a genus in 1841. The entire genus is native to South America.

Species
 Bia alienata Didr. - Brazil, Bolivia, Paraguay, N Argentina
 Bia capivarensis Medeiros & Alves - Serra da Capivara
 Bia fallax (Müll.Arg.) G.L.Webster - Peru, Rondônia
 Bia fendleri (Müll.Arg.) G.L.Webster - Guyana, Venezuela, Amazonas State of Brazil
 Bia lessertiana Baill. - Fr Guiana, Suriname, Guyana, N Brazil
 Bia manuelii V.W. Steinm. & Ram.-Amezcua, 2013, Sierra de Coalcomán, Michoacán, Mexico

formerly included
moved to Zuckertia 
Bia cordata - Zuckertia cordata

References

Euphorbiaceae genera